Javier Pantaleón (1941–1978) was an Argentine singer.

Author and coauthor of songs

"Tocamelo a chacarera" (chacarera)
"To my Quiaca" (takirari)
"Chaya drunk" (chaya)
"I regret mataco" (air bailecito)
"Counterpoints in bagualas" (baguala)
"Let there be" (bolero)
"Verses of a student" (serenade)
"I am the singer of the dawn" (poem-song)
'Weeping' (waltz)
"This Christmas Without You" (waltz)
"Skip sings" (baguala)
"Pantaleon the bagualero" (baguala)
"My years of love" (serenade)
"The moment you leave" (bolero)
"Girl, you're in love" (serenade)
"Letter to a bride" (serenade)
"From carnival guard" (bailecito)
"To my Skip linda" (samba)
'Girl Animaná "(baguala)
"The penalty in bloom" (bailecito)
"We are not two" (Inca dance)
"Without you there is no sun" (serenade)
"I feel guilty" (serenade)
"Concerto in solitude" (serenade)
"Not anymore this loneliness" (serenade)
"The love that I breathe" (serenade)
"This verse is for you" (serenade)
"Serenade for a flower

20th-century Argentine male singers
People from Jujuy Province
1941 births
1978 deaths
Road incident deaths in Argentina